The Trout and Salmonid Collection is a special collection of literature and archives in the Montana State University Library's Merrill G. Burlingame Special Collections Library. The collection is also known as The Bud Lilly Trout and Salmonid Bibliography, named after founder Bud Lilly. The approximately 11,000-volume collection, established in 1999, is devoted to preserving literary (fiction and non-fiction), scientific, government and media resources related to all aspects of trout and other salmonids.  The collection contains materials in many languages and is not restricted by geography.  It is considered a world-class collection of international significance relative to the study of trout and salmonids.

Creation

In 1999, then Dean of the Montana State University Library, Bruce Morton, and local angling legend Bud Lilly conceived the idea of forming a world-class collection of literature on trout and salmonids. Montana State University, because of its historic fisheries science program and proximity to hundreds of miles of blue ribbon fisheries, is often referred to as "Trout U." Lilly, through his connections with the angling industry, organized an initial donation of over 10,000 volumes from an anonymous collector in Montana.  From this donation, an initial collection of over 4,000 titles was established.  Through the work of special collections librarian James Thull and Montana State University Library Scholar in Residence Paul Schullery, the collection grew to over 10,000 volumes by 2011.

Description and scope
The collection is organized and cataloged according to the Library of Congress Classification system. The collection holds a broad array of works encompassing biology, ecology, angling, politics, economics, and the culinary arts; spiritual, literary and philosophical works; books, periodicals, government publications, and scientific reports; diaries, theses and dissertations. The collection is not considered a "rare book" collection but rather a focused research collection.  Although the collection does contain originals of rare titles, it also contains many reprints. The collection has been built through donations and purchases from a variety of book sources as desirable titles become available.  Government documents related to trout and salmonids are often purchased as well as requested from government agencies when they will benefit the collection.

Archives
The collection also comprises the personal papers of many luminaries and influential authors, artists, scientists and angling industry insiders associated with trout and salmonids.  These archives include:

 Robert J. Behnke (1929-2013) papers 1857-2000: Behnke was a fisheries biologist and conservationist and was recognized as a world authority on the classification of salmonid fishes.
 Nick Lyons (1932- ) ephemera collection (corporate records and personal papers 1932-2005): Lyons is an author and publisher of numerous important works on angling by Lyons Press.
 Charles E. Brooks (1921-1986) papers 1921-2002: Brooks was a retired U.S. Air Force officer who became a prominent author on fly fishing in Yellowstone and the Madison River.
 Datus C. Proper (1964-2003) papers 1964-2003: Proper was a career Foreign Service Officer who retired to the Gallatin Valley and became a prominent angling author in the fly fishing press.
 Norman Strung (1941-1991) literary manuscripts and correspondence, 1966-1982: Strung was a 1963 graduate of Montana State University who established himself as a prolific outdoor writer for Field and Stream and author of 15 books on hunting and fishing.
 Alfred T. Pellicane (1949-2001) papers 1962-2000: Pellicane was a New York fly angler who collected angling literature. He drafted but never published a bibliography, entitled Profiles in Angling Literature.
 Harry B. Mitchell (1933- ) papers 1953-1965
 Louis Agassiz (1807-1873) letters 1854-1858
 Sylvester Nemes (1922-2011) papers 1973-2010: Nemes was a WWII Air Corps veteran, author and angler who published numerous seminal works on the history and use of Soft Hackle Flies.
 George F. Grant (1906-1908) papers 1973-1985: Grant was an angler, author and conservationist from Butte, Montana. He was active for many years on the Big Hole River.
 Bud Lilly (1925- ) papers 1926-2008: Lilly is an angler, former fly shop owner, fishing guide, author and conservationist.
 Salmon Poisoning Research Collection papers 1923-1999

Highlights
The collection contains both old and rare works on the topic of trout and salmonids as well as important seminal works on all aspects of the topic.

  
 This is the oldest book in the collection.  Roughly 12 other libraries in the world hold this volume; six in the US (including two copies held by Harvard), three in France and three in Germany.  It is thought to be the first book to ever mention, although it is in passing, fish or fishing in the New World.
 
 A rare little self-published book meant for people passing through the state who want to drop a line in the water on a quick stop. Deals with fishing access points along the interstate and includes hand-drawn maps, directions, species, etc. Likely the rarest book in the collection as according to WorldCat it is only held by two libraries.
 
 One of the earliest treatises published on fish and game laws and one of the more prominent of the period in terms of details and forward thinking. The collection also include works on US fish and game laws published as early as 1777.

Access and use

The collection is housed in a controlled area and browsing stacks is not allowed to protect the collection.  The Merrill G. Burlingame Special Collections Library contains a large reading room and is open to the public during normal library hours.  Archivists in the special collections library assist researchers in finding materials and using them in the reading room. The collection is also accessible via inter-library loans.  The collection is fully indexed and searchable via the Montana State University Library online catalog system. In helping create the collection, Bud Lilly, a 1949 alumnus of the university, stated he  "would like to see students and others broaden their perspective of trout beyond the 'how-to' and 'where-to-go' angling books that publishing houses started spawning in the 1960s".

Related initiatives
  Cultural Atlas of Angling in the Greater Yellowstone Ecosystem
 The atlas is an MSU website celebrating the stories, sights, and sounds of angling containing  the artifacts, recorded histories, documents, soundscapes, and realia that shaped the history of fly fishing in the northern rocky mountains. It will provide a digital, Internet-accessible database to explore these angling experiences from anywhere in the world. The online atlas is designed to enhance accessibility of research resources for students and scholars of the humanities, arts, literature, angling, environmentalism, ecology, and the Greater Yellowstone Ecosystem.
  Bud Lilly Trout and Salmonid Initiative
 The initiative represents a series of endowments designed to:
 Help build the world's most dynamic collection of books, gray literature, and manuscripts devoted to trout and salmonids.
 Fund an annual lecture series for speakers renowned for their contributions to topics on the histories of trout and salmonid species, angling, fisheries management, ecology, literature, anthropology, business and economics, and politics.
 Build a faculty endowment to sustain the development and management of the Trout and Salmonid Collection and work with other MSU faculty, researchers, students, and members of the general public, coordinating acquisitions of books for the collection, special collections reference work, attending trout–related conferences and creating worldwide websites to connect interested groups to MSU resources.
 Angling Oral History Project
The project collects, preserves, and disseminates histories, stories and opinions of anglers, authors, artists, politicians and outfitters.

See also
 Bibliography of fly fishing

Notes

University and college academic libraries in the United States
Montana State University
Salmonidae